Connor Cook (born January 29, 1993) is a former American football quarterback. He played college football for the Michigan State Spartans and was their starting quarterback from 2013 to 2015. He holds the record for most career wins at Michigan State. Cook was selected in the fourth round of the 2016 NFL Draft by the Oakland Raiders. After initially serving as the third-string backup to Derek Carr and Matt McGloin, Cook played in his first NFL game in the Raiders' last regular season game of the 2016 NFL season after Carr and McGloin suffered injuries. Following this, he was named the starter for the Raiders' playoff game against the Houston Texans and became the first quarterback in NFL history to make his first career start in a playoff game.

Early years
Cook was born in Parma Heights, Ohio, on January 29, 1993. Cook is from an athletic family: His father, Chris, played football at Indiana; his mother, Donna, played basketball at Cincinnati; and his older sister, Jackie, played basketball at Old Dominion. Cook attended Walsh Jesuit High School in Cuyahoga Falls, Ohio. He was ranked as the nation's 13th best quarterback recruit by Rivals.com.

College career
Upon enrolling at Michigan State, Cook was redshirted as a freshman in 2011. He spent the 2012 season as a backup to Andrew Maxwell. After Maxwell was benched, Cook helped lead the team to a win in the 2012 Buffalo Wild Wings Bowl, completing four of 11 passes for 47 yards and a touchdown. Overall, he appeared in three games, completing nine of 17 passes for 94 yards with a touchdown and an interception. He entered the 2013 season as the backup to Maxwell again. After Maxwell struggled, Cook took over as the starter after the first game and remained the starter the rest of the year. He led Michigan State to a 34-24 victory over the Ohio State Buckeyes in the Big Ten Championship Game and was named MVP after throwing for 304 yards with three touchdowns. He then led the Spartans to a 24–20 victory over Stanford in the 2014 Rose Bowl. He was named the offensive MVP after throwing for 332 yards and two touchdowns. Cook finished the season with 2,755 passing yards and 22 touchdowns.

As a junior in 2014, Cook passed 3,214 yards with 24 touchdowns. He led the Spartans to 2015 Cotton Bowl, where they defeated the higher-ranked Baylor Bears, 42–41. As a senior in 2015 Cook led the Spartans to a 16–13 win over the Iowa Hawkeyes in the Big Ten Championship Game and was named MVP for the second time in three years. 

The victory in that Big Ten Championship Game earned them a spot in the College Football Playoff (2015 Cotton Bowl), where they lost to the Alabama Crimson Tide, 38–0. Cook finished the season with 3,131 passing yards and 24 touchdowns,  completing 56% of his passes. He won the 2015 Johnny Unitas Golden Arm Award as the nation's outstanding senior or fourth year quarterback.  For his career, he completed 673 of 1,170 passes for a school record 9,194 yards with 71 touchdowns and 22 interceptions.

College statistics

Professional career

Oakland Raiders
Cook was drafted by the Oakland Raiders in the fourth round with the 100th pick in the 2016 NFL Draft. He was the seventh quarterback chosen in the draft. On May 9, 2016, the Raiders signed Cook to a 4-year, $2.95 million contract with a signing bonus of $619,890.

Cook began his rookie season for the Raiders as the third-string quarterback on the depth chart behind starter Derek Carr and second-stringer Matt McGloin. On December 24, 2016, Cook was raised to backup quarterback after Carr suffered a season-ending right fibula injury. On January 1, 2017, Cook made his NFL debut, entering the game late in the first half after starter McGloin suffered a shoulder injury. He played for the remainder of the game. In the third quarter, he threw his first NFL touchdown, a 32-yard pass to wide receiver Amari Cooper. He completed 14 of 21 passes for 150 passing yards, a touchdown, and an interception as the Raiders lost to the Denver Broncos by a score of 24–6. On January 4, Cook was named the starter for the AFC Wildcard Game against the Houston Texans. McGloin was limited in practice due to his injury but was still active as Cook's backup for the playoff game. Cook became the first quarterback in the Super Bowl era to make his first career start in a playoff game. On January 7, 2017, in the AFC Wildcard Game against the Texans, Cook completed 18 of 45 passes for 161 yards, one touchdown, and three interceptions as the Raiders lost 27–14. In the loss, he threw his first career postseason touchdown to Andre Holmes in the fourth quarter.

Cook saw no action in 2017 as the third-string quarterback behind Carr and new second-stringer EJ Manuel. He was only active for one game the whole season.

On September 1, 2018, Cook was released after the Raiders traded for A. J. McCarron.

Carolina Panthers
On September 6, 2018, Cook was signed to the Carolina Panthers' practice squad. He was released on October 9, 2018.

Cincinnati Bengals 
Cook was signed by the Cincinnati Bengals to their practice squad on November 5, 2018.

Detroit Lions 
On January 1, 2019, Cook signed a reserve/future contract with the Detroit Lions. In June 2019, the Lions released Cook and signed Quarterback David Fales.

Houston Roughnecks 
Cook was drafted in the 1st round with the second pick of the 2020 XFL Draft by the Houston Roughnecks. However, Cook lost the quarterback competition to assigned player P.J. Walker and assumed the backup position. He had his contract terminated when the league suspended operations on April 10, 2020.

NFL career statistics

Regular season

Postseason

References

External links

 Michigan State Spartans bio

1993 births
Living people
People from Hinckley, Ohio
Sportspeople from Greater Cleveland
Players of American football from Ohio
American football quarterbacks
Michigan State Spartans football players
Oakland Raiders players
Carolina Panthers players
Cincinnati Bengals players
Detroit Lions players
Houston Roughnecks players